Bangaon is a Kolkata Suburban Railway junction station on the Sealdah–Bangaon line and Ranaghat–Bangaon line. It is located in North 24 Parganas district in the Indian state of West Bengal. It serves Bangaon and its surrounding areas.

History
In 1882–84 the Bengal Central Railway Company constructed two lines: one from Dum Dum to Khulna, now in Bangladesh, via Bangaon and the other linking Ranaghat and Bangaon.

The Bengal Central Railway was formed in 1881 to construct and operate a line to Khulna. It was merged with Eastern Bengal Railway in 1903.

Dum Dum–Barasat–Ashoknagar—Habra–Gobardanga-Bangaon sector was electrified in 1963–64.

Routes
In North line commuter trains run up to Ranaghat Jn. (2 trains goes up to Shantipur & 1 train goes up to Lalgola). In South line commuter trains run mostly up to  via Barasat Jn. Four trains run on circular route via Dum Dum Jn. and Ballygunge Jn.

 Extended trains timetable

Border
Bangaon is the last station on the line, but the line goes up to the India–Bangladesh border and beyond.

Petrapole, the Indian side of the international border, with a land customs station, handles more than half of the 4 billion dollar trade between India and Bangladesh. With the remote possibility of improvements in the narrow roads leading to the border, because of land acquisition problems, the focus is now on improving the rail transportation system.

Gallery

See Also 

 Sealdah railway station
 Birati railway station
 Barasat Junction railway station
 Dum Dum Junction railway station
 Dum Dum Cantonment railway station

References

External links
 Trains to Sealdah
Trains from Sealdah
 Trains from Ranaghat to Bangaon

Railway stations in North 24 Parganas district
Sealdah railway division
Kolkata Suburban Railway stations
Railway junction stations in West Bengal